Gilberto Mercado (born 2 May 1962) is a Colombian former weightlifter. He competed in the men's middleweight event at the 1984 Summer Olympics.

References

External links
 

1962 births
Living people
Colombian male weightlifters
Olympic weightlifters of Colombia
Weightlifters at the 1984 Summer Olympics
Central American and Caribbean Games medalists in weightlifting
Place of birth missing (living people)
20th-century Colombian people
21st-century Colombian people